The Pole of Communist Revival in France (PRCF) is a French political party founded in January 2004. It was an internal tendency of the French Communist Party (PCF) that left the party, rejecting the PCF's "mutation" beginning in the early 1990s.

The president-delegate of the PRCF is Leon Landini, the president of the National Political Committee (CPN) is Jean-Pierre Hemmen, the national, directing political spokesman of Communist Initiative is Georges Gastaud, and Georges Hage, a former member of parliament for the Nord departement and senior of the National Assembly, is the honorary president.

The PRCF is organized in associations in the French départements, sections and cells (democratic centralism). It is based on the theory of scientific socialism of Karl Marx, Friedrich Engels, Vladimir Lenin and other revolutionary thinkers. The PRCF publishes the Initiative communiste (Communist Initiative) monthly magazine and the theoretical review EtincelleS.

The organisation broadcasts a programme called Convergence each Monday from 8 to 9 pm on Radio Galère. Its youth wing, Young People for the Communist Revival in France (JRCF), took part  in the mass movement against the Contrat première embauche in 2006.

References

External links
 

2004 establishments in France
Communist parties in France
Far-left politics in France
Eurosceptic parties in France
Political parties established in 2004